Lost time is a concept in traffic engineering.

Lost Time may also refer to:

Lost Time (12 Rods album), 2002
Lost Time (Tacocat album), 2016

See also
 In Search of Lost Time (French: À la recherche du temps perdu), a novel in seven volumes by Marcel Proust
 Time Lost, a 1997 album by Enchant